The 2022 Brno municipal election was held on 23 and 24 September 2022 as part of the nationwide municipal elections. Coalition of Civic Democratic Party and TOP 09 led by incumbent Mayor Markéta Vaňková has won the election. Following election ODS and TOP 09 formed wide coalition with ANO 2011, KDU-ČSL, STAN, Pirates and ČSSD. Markéta Vaňková is set to continue as Mayor.

Background
2018 election was won by ANO 2011 ahead of ODS. Markéta Vaňková, candidate of ODS became new Mayor while ANO 2011 remained in opposition. Vaňková is running for reelection as the leader of ODS and TOP 09 alliance. KDU-ČSL formed electoral alliance with STAN. Petr Hladík is electoral leader of this alliance. On 26 January 2022 René Černý was announced as leader of ANO 2011.

Opinion polls

Result

References

2022
2022 elections in the Czech Republic